Dongnimmun Station is a station on the Seoul Subway Line 3 in Seodaemun-gu, Seoul. It is named after the nearby Independence Gate.

Station layout

Vicinity
Exit 1: Inwangsan, Fortress Wall of Seoul, Inwangsan IPARK apartment complex
Exit 2: Muak-dong regional government
Exit 3: Dongnimmun Elementary School
Exit 3-1: Muak Hyundai apartment complex
Exit 4: Independence Gate
Exit 5: Seodaemun Independence Park, Seodaemun Prison History Hall, National Memorial of the Korean Provisional Government, Hansung Science High School

References 

Seoul Metropolitan Subway stations
Metro stations in Seodaemun District
Metro stations in Jongno District
Seoul Subway Line 3
Railway stations in South Korea opened in 1985